Castle Mountain is in the Beartooth Mountains in the U.S. state of Montana, about  east-northeast of Cooke City. It is located in the Gallatin National Forest and Custer National Forest, just outside the northern boundary of Yellowstone National Park in the Absaroka-Beartooth Wilderness.

The peak is the third tallest in the Beartooth Mountains, and the highest point in Carbon County, Montana.

References

Castle
Beartooth Mountains
Mountains of Carbon County, Montana